7th Grade Civil Servant is a 2013 South Korean television series starring Choi Kang-hee and Joo Won as rookie spies who trained together, and later become NIS agents who must hide their real identities from each other even as they fall in love. It aired on MBC from January 23 to March 28, 2013, on Wednesdays and Thursdays at 21:55 (KST) for 20 episodes.

The series is a remake of the 2009 film My Girlfriend Is An Agent. Early working titles were "Secret Agent War" and "The Secret Lovers".

Plot
Love and espionage collide in this drama of the National Intelligence Service's rookie agents. Han Gil-ro (Joo Won) realizes his dream of becoming an international man of mystery, after a childhood spent poring over James Bond films. Kim Seo-won (Choi Kang-hee) spices things up as a goofy, yet determined agent, but it's not all 007 glamor. Both Gil-ro and Seo-won must learn what it takes to uphold their sworn duty, even at the sacrifice of their happiness — and lives.

Cast
Choi Kang-hee as Kim Seo-won / Kim Kyung-ja
Joo Won as Han Gil-ro / Han Pil-hoon
Hwang Chan-sung as Gong Do-ha
Kim Min-seo as Shin Sun-mi
Ahn Nae-sang as Kim Won-seok
Jang Young-nam as Jang Young-soon
Kim Soo-hyun as Kim Mi-rae
Lim Yoon-ho as JJ / Choi Woo-jin
Dokgo Young-jae as Han Joo-man, Gil-ro's father
Im Ye-jin as Go Soo-ja, Gil-ro's mother
Lee Han-wi as Kim Pan-seok, Seo-won's father
Kim Mi-kyung as Oh Mak-nae, Seo-won's mother
Noh Young-hak as Kim Min-ho, Seo-won's younger brother
Choi Jong-hwan as Oh Kwang-jae
Ha Shi-eun as Jin-joo
Son Jin-young as Kim Poong-eon
Lee El as Park Soo-young
Jung In-gi as Kim Sung-joon
Seo Seung-man as IT&TI manager
Lee Hye-eun as Won-seok's wife
Uhm Tae-woong as Choi Woo-hyuk (guest appearance, Ep. 1–4)

Reception

Original soundtrack

Part 1

Part 2

Part 3

Part 4

Awards and nominations

International broadcast
Japan: Aired on KNTV beginning March 30, 2013.
Indonesia: Aired on B-Channel.
Malaysia: Aired on TV9.
Thailand: Aired on Workpoint TV.
Philippines: Aired on Net 25 beginning February 3, 2014.
Singapore: Aired on VV Drama beginning June 20, 2015. Also aired on Channel U beginning April 9, 2016.

References

External links
 7th Grade Civil Servant official MBC website 
 
 
 Level 7 Civil Servant at MBC Global Media

2013 South Korean television series debuts
2013 South Korean television series endings
MBC TV television dramas
Korean-language television shows
South Korean action television series
South Korean romantic comedy television series
National Intelligence Service (South Korea) in fiction